Bukov Vrh (in older sources also Sveta Sobota) is a dispersed settlement above Poljane nad Škofjo Loko in the Municipality of Gorenja Vas–Poljane in the Upper Carniola region of Slovenia.

The local church is dedicated to Our Lady of Sorrows, locally known as Holy Sabbath Church. It was originally a Gothic structure but was rebuilt and expanded in 1739.

References

External links 

Bukov Vrh on Geopedia

Populated places in the Municipality of Gorenja vas-Poljane